The Austro-Hungarian Danube Flotilla was a section of the navy of Austria-Hungary established after the Austro-Prussian War. It consisted of 9 gunboats  (valued at 17.5 million golden crowns), 8 armoured patrol boats (valued at 9 million golden crowns) and 55 other miscellaneous boats (valued at 4.5 million golden crowns), with a combined total manpower of 1000 soldiers. The flotilla fired the first shots of the First World War during the night of July 28 to 29, 1914 (only a few hours after the Declaration of War had been transmitted) and continued to participate in the war on the Eastern Front between 1914 and 1918 until Austria-Hungary's collapse. The Trianon Treaty of 1920 divided the ships of the flotilla between Austria and Hungary.

See also
 Hungarian River Forces

References

Military units and formations of Austria-Hungary in World War I